Fullbore Target Rifle (TR) is a precision rifle shooting sport governed by the International Confederation of Fullbore Rifle Associations (ICFRA). The sport evolved as a distinct British and Commonwealth of Nations discipline from Service rifle (SR) shooting in the late 1960s. Its development was heavily influenced by the British National Rifle Association (NRA). Due to this history, it is usually contested amongst the shooting events at the Commonwealth Games, although not at the Olympics. World Championships are held on a four-year cycle. The annual NRA Imperial Meeting at Bisley in the UK is globally recognised as a historic annual meeting for the discipline.

Nordic fullbore rifle is a variation of arranged by the Scandinavian rifle associations including the National Rifle Association of Norway, DGI Shooting (formerly De Danske Skytteforeninger) and the Swedish Shooting Sport Federation (formerly Frivilliga Skytterörelsen). Nordic field shooting competitions are shot at varied distances out to 600 m.

History
Originally derived from service rifle, Target Rifle was shot with rifles of military origin, and the rules followed the adoption of cartridges by the military - from the .451 Whitworth rifle to the .303 Lee-Metford, and eventually to 7.62 NATO and .308. Modifications such as custom stocks and barrels became increasingly common but rifles were nonetheless built around actions of military design.

In 1970, George Swenson and Laurie Ingram developed the Swing rifle as an alternative to the dominant designs of the day, which were built around the Lee-Enfield No. 4 and Mauser 1898. The Swing was one of the first actions designed explicitly for target shooting, with attention paid to a short lock time and clean trigger break. The Swing influenced the design of the RPA Quadlock. The 1970s also saw the development of the Mauser-influenced Musgrave Target Rifle in South Africa, with the Australian Barnard Model P action entering production in 1982.

Equipment

Standard rifle 
To level the playing field as much as possible without stifling progress, and to make it possible for riflemen of all budgets to compete seriously, the rifle or all its component parts must be 'readily available in quantity'.

Sights 
Modern target rifles are extremely accurate, and have aperture sights which are fully adjustable for elevation and windage. They developed from the observation that the eye when viewing through a circular aperture will naturally centre the black circular target, on a white backing. Initially this was accomplished using a standard 'post' foresight at the muzzle of the rifle, which over time developed into a tube with a circular ring aperture so that the black 'bull' would be viewed within the foresight ring which in turn was centred in the rear aperture. This arrangement improved the accuracy as the sight distance was increased with the aperture sight closer to the marksman  than that of the military 'iron' rear leaf sight fitted directly to the barrel.

Calibers 
Fullbore Target Rifle involves prone position single shot precision shooting using adjustable aperture sights at 'round bull' targets at distances from 300 to 1000 yards, with each shot being carefully scored and analysed. The usual calibre used was .303 British (standard military) up to the late 1950s when the NATO countries adopted the .308 Winchester/7.62×51mm NATO as the new military interoperable choice of ammunition. Under ICFRA Rules, .223 Remington/5.56x45 NATO is permitted as an alternative. However, many matches such as the NRA Imperial Meeting require competitors to use issued ammunition - which is typically only offered in .308. The .303 British calibre is still in use by Service Rifle shooters and was exclusively used by Fullbore in the Short, Magazine Lee–Enfield (SMLE) No.1 Mk. III and Lee-Enfield No. 4 rifles.

Clothing
Modern target rifle shooters commonly use specialised stiff leather or canvas shooting jackets to maintain a stable prone position. Riflemen also widely wear shooting gloves on their support hand to stabilise the rifle and to protect the hand from a single point sling.

Competitions 
World Championships have been organised by ICFRA since 2003 and are held on a four-year cycle. Championships for TR-Class and F-Class are held separately, offset by two years. The TR Championship includes both an individual and a team event. The Team event is known historically as the Palma Match and the Team World Champions are awarded the Palma Trophy, which dates to 1876.

Fullbore Rifle is contested within the Shooting events at the Commonwealth Games. These are the only major multi-sport Games to include the discipline, with other events such as the Olympic or Asian Games focussing on ISSF-regulated smallbore and air rifle disciplines. The Commonwealth Shooting Federation also holds a CSF Championship in the run-up to the Games, serving as a test-event for the Games venues and final selection opportunity for Games squads.

The Imperial Meeting, organised by the British NRA at the National Shooting Centre, Bisley is regarded as one of the leading Target Rifle events globally, and has been hugely influential in the development of the sport. National teams routinely travel to the Meeting, particularly from Commonwealth nations. The Kolapore Match is contested annually by the international teams in attendance. The Macdonald-Stewart Pavilion (a.k.a. "Canada House") was constructed at Bisley Camp in 1897 specifically to accommodate the Canadian team. Bisley's influence is further illustrated by the South African terminology, where Target Rifle is called "Bisley Shooting", the governing body is the South African Bisley Union (SABU) and almost any target shooting competition is known as a "Bisley".

In Canada, target rifle competitions at the national level are regulated by the Dominion of Canada Rifle Association.

The annual US National Championship is currently held during August at Camp Perry in Port Clinton, Ohio.

Variations

Match rifle 
Match Rifle shooting is a long-range target shooting discipline for civilian riflemen shot at 1,000 to 1,200 yards (approximately 914 to 1,097 meters), peculiar to the UK and several Commonwealth of Nations countries, and run according to rules set out by the National Rifle Association, UK. Elcho Shield is an example of such an annual fullbore Match Rifle competition.

Match Rifle can be thought of as an extreme, experimental version of Target Rifle (TR). Whilst the same calibres are permitted (.308” Winchester / 7.62 x 51 mm NATO and .223” Remington / 5.56 x 45 mm NATO), Match Rifle starts at 1000 yards where TR finishes, and goes up to 1500 yards but 1200 yards is the usual maximum range in most competitions. Telescopic sights are permitted, as is hand-loaded ammunition (typically for .308 / 7.62 with bullets weighing between 190 and 230 grains, as opposed to the 155 grain bullets normally used in TR); unlike TR, a rest may be used to support, or steady, the hand supporting the rifle (a sling as used in TR is also an option), but the rifle may not be directly supported by a rest or bipod. Whilst most people shoot Match Rifle prone, a sizeable minority shoot supine (“back position”), and a small number (who would be unable for medical reasons to shoot prone or supine) shoot seated at tables. Most shoots involve 15 or 20 shots to count (usually with two convertible sighting shots permitted) at each of 1000, 1100 and 1200 yards. With few ranges extending back to Match Rifle distances, most shooting in the UK takes place on Stickledown at Bisley.

See also 
 International Confederation of Fullbore Rifle Associations
 High power rifle and Civilian Marksmanship Program, U.S. variants

References

External links 
 National Rifle Association (UK)
 Target Shooter Magazine

Shooting sports events
Rifles